The Malindi pipit (Anthus melindae) is a species of bird in the family Motacillidae.
It is found in Kenya and Somalia.
Its natural habitats are subtropical or tropical dry lowland grassland and subtropical or tropical seasonally wet or flooded lowland grassland.
It is threatened by habitat loss.

References

Malindi pipit
Birds of the Horn of Africa
Malindi pipit
Taxonomy articles created by Polbot
Northern Zanzibar–Inhambane coastal forest mosaic